Poder Popular may refer to:

Poder Popular (Chile), a form of workers democracy or political power that has sporadically surfaced in modern Chilean history
People's Power (Colombia), a political movement in Colombia founded in 1981